Bibio johannis is a species of fly in the family Bibionidae. It is found in the Palearctic.

References

Bibionidae
Insects described in 1767
Nematoceran flies of Europe
Taxa named by Carl Linnaeus